Marji (transliteration: marjiʿ; plural: marājiʿ), literally meaning "source to follow" or "religious reference", is a title given to the highest level of Twelver Shia religious cleric, with the authority given by a hawzah (a seminary where Shi'a Muslim scholars are educated) to make legal decisions within the confines of Islamic law for followers and clerics below him in rank. The highest ranking marjiʿ is known as the marja al-mutlaq or marja al-taqlid al-mutlaq.  A Marji' is also, or usually is also, a Grand Ayatollah.

Sources differ as to when the institution of the marja˓ emerged, with Murtadha al-Ansari (d. 1864) and Muhammad ibn Ya'qub al-Kulayni (d. 940 or 941 CE) both being called the first marja'.

As of 2023 there are approximately over 50 living Maraji, almost all residing in Iran or Iraq.

Title
Currently, maraji' are accorded the title Grand Ayatollah ( ʾĀyatullāh al-ʿUẓmā). Previously, the titles of Allamah (such as Allameh Tabatabaei, Allameh Majlesi, Allameh Hilli) and Imam (such as Imam Khomeini, Imam Rohani, Imam Shirazi and Imam Sadr) have also been used. Another source (Abbas Djavadi) states a marja' is "usually" a Grand Ayatollah.

Someone who follows/"imitates" a marja' (who performs taqlid) is known as a muqallid.

Other clerical titles
Ayatollahs
The title of an ayatollah is bestowed when a scholar/cleric reaches the level in the hawza (seminary) where his students and followers trust him to answer their questions on religious issues. An ayatollah must also have published a juristic book, known as a risalah amaliyah—a manual or treatise of practical religious rulings arranged according to topics dealing with ritual purity, worship, social issues, business, and political affairs. The risalah contains an ayatollah's fatwas on different topics, according to his knowledge of the most authentic Islamic sources and their application to current life. Traditionally only the most renowned ayatollahs of the given time published a risalah. Today, however, many ayatollahs of varying degrees of illustriousness have published one, while some of the renowned ones have refused to do so.
Marja al-taqlid al-mutlaq
The highest marja' or “first-among-equals”, is called the Marja al-taqlid al-mutlaq.

Role, authority, requirements
Traditionally, taqlid or "imitation" of an expert in Islamic jurisprudence (a mujtahid) is not only lawful but obligatory on many religious questions for all Muslims not so trained themselves; (on "matters of belief" or usulu 'din, it is obligatory for Shi'a to train themselves).
From the perspective of Shi'i jurisprudence, during the occultation of the Mahdi, (for the past 1000+ years) the highest ranking Shia hawzah clerics are bestowed with responsibility for understanding and explaining Islamic religious jurisprudence. As of the 19th century, the Shia ulama taught believers to turn to "a source of taqlid" (marja' at-taqlid) "for advice and guidance and as a model to be imitated."

Authority
Where a difference in opinion exists between the maraji', each of them provides their own opinion and the muqallid (their followers) will follow their own marja's opinion on that subject. Exempted from the requirement to follow a marja' are  mujtahid, i.e. someone who has completed advanced training (dars kharij) in the hawza and has acquired the license to engage in ijtihad (ʾijāz al-ʾijtihād) from one or several ayatollahs. However ijtihad is not always comprehensive and so a mujtahid may be an expert in one particular area of Islamic jurisprudence (fiqh) and exercise ijtihad therein, but follow a marja' in other areas of fiqh.

Who and where
Several senior Grand Ayatollahs preside over hawzas (religious seminaries). The hawzas of Qom and Najaf are the preeminent seminary centers for the training of Shia clergymen. However, there are other smaller hawzas in many other cities around the world, the biggest ones being Karbala (Iraq), Isfahan (Iran) and Mashhad (Iran). 

There are 56 Maraji living worldwide as of 2023, mostly residing in Najaf and Qom. The most prominent among them are Hossein Vahid Khorasani, Ali Khamenei, Mousa Shubairi Zanjani, Sayyid Sadeq Rohani, Naser Makarem Shirazi, Sadiq Hussaini Shirazi, Hossein Noori Hamedani and Abdollah Javadi-Amoli in Qom; Ali al-Sistani, Muhammad al-Fayadh, Muhammad Saeed al-Hakim and Bashir al-Najafi in Najaf.

Dispute over Marja al-taqlid al-mutlaq
In the early 1990s, the leading marja', Abu al-Qasim al-Khoei, died and Ali al-Sistani, "emerged" as  the  marja al-mutlaq or highest Marja' in the world of Shia Islam. According to Mohamad Bazzi, Al-Sistani's word "on religious matters carries the most weight" among Shia. 

However, in 1994, the regime of the Islamic Republic of Iran (IRI) declared it was the Supreme Leader of Iran, Ali Khamenei who was "the single marja˓ al-taqlid" or "undisputed marja˓". 

According to Mohamad Bazzi, this was a bid "to displace" Ali Sistani, the true Marja al-taqlid al-mutlaq, "and his allies in Najaf", but it "failed" because Khamenei "had modest religious credentials (he was only elevated to the rank of ayatollah after Khomeini’s death, so he could assume the post of supreme leader). Faced with Baathist persecution and an Iranian power grab, Sistani was able to retain his position."  Gleave does not mention al-Sistani but states that Khamenei's "position as the Marja˓ al-taqlid" has  "remained a matter of dispute".

Conditions for a marja'
There is no formalized specific process nor official body resembling a council of ulama to designate someone a marja al-taqlid, because reaching the position of marja al-taqlid "is entirely at the discretion of the believers themselves". 
Nonetheless, there are "general principles" for their selection including  several "conditions" which have been "accepted unanimously by Shiʿite theologians".
maturity (bulugh), 
reasonableness (aql), 
being of the male sex (dhukurrat),  
faith (iman),  
justice (edalat), and 
legitimacy of birth.
Another condition is being able to raise enough money "to finance the education of religious students" from donations from the believers, is one of the qualifications of a marja').

History

First Marja' 
Shiʿi "biographical compilations generally" consider Muhammad ibn Ya'qub al-Kulayni (d. 940 or 941) -- one of the first compilers of Shiʿite hadith -- to be "the first" post-occultation  marja al-taqlid, according to Neguin Yavari
and Eric Hooglund. However, according to Robert Gleave, the institution of the marja˓ did not emerged until the nineteenth century, with the first universally recognized marja˓, "the influential mujtahid Murtadha al-Ansari (d. 1864)".  Still another source -- four mullahs at al-islam.org who were asked directly "Who was the first ever Marja-e-Taqleed?" -- was non-committal. only one of four  (Mohammad Al-Musawi) replied and would only say, "from the time of the Prophet (SAWA) and the Infallible Imams, Muslims who lived in places far away from them, were ordered to refer in religious matters to the scholar in their area".

Shiite authorities in the history of Shi'ism have an important role in the religious, political and social thought of their communities. One example is the fatwa of Mirza Mohammed Hassan Husseini Shirazi imposing sanctions on the use of tobacco during Qajar rule, which led to the abolition of the tobacco concession.

See also

Ijtihad
Hawza
Risalah (fiqh)
Society of Seminary Teachers of Qom
List of Ayatollahs
List of deceased Maraji
List of current Maraji

Notes

References

External links 
 Slate Magazine's "So you want to be an Ayatollah", explaining how Shiite clerics earn the title

Religious leadership roles
Shia theology
Arabic words and phrases
Islamic honorifics
 
Hawza
Islamic scholars
Islamic religious leaders
Lists of Islamic religious leaders
Muslim scholars of Islamic jurisprudence
Titles
Marja'